The Hautza or Autza, is a mountain on the Spanish side of the border in Navarre. It is located between Elizondo in Baztan (Navarre, Spain) and Saint-Étienne-de-Baïgorry (Lower Navarre, France).

Geography
The Hautza is the highest point on the watershed between the Baztan and the Aldude Valley (respectively the Bidasoa and Nive basins). The layout of the border avoids the summit which is located in Spain. The most common and practicable route starts at the Izpegi Pass, where the customs used to be (there is an inn and souvenir shop now). A hiking circular route can be followed with clearly signed route marks, while the walk is demanding and quite long (approx. return time 5h00).

Etymology
Its name is based on a local oronym: Hautz.

Mountains of Navarre
Mountains of the Pyrenees